Lipen Glacier is a 5 km long and 3.5 km wide glacier draining the east slopes of the Trojan Range on Anvers Island in the Palmer Archipelago, Antarctica.  Situated east of Iliad Glacier and north of Rhesus Glacier.  Flowing northeastwards into the head of Patagonia Bay east of Gourdon Peninsula and west of Thompson Peninsula.

The glacier is named after the settlement of Lipen in northwestern Bulgaria.

Location
British mapping in 1980.

See also
 List of glaciers in the Antarctic
 Glaciology

Maps
 British Antarctic Territory. Scale 1:200000 topographic map No. 3217. DOS 610 - W 64 62. Tolworth, UK, 1980.
 Antarctic Digital Database (ADD). Scale 1:250000 topographic map of Antarctica. Scientific Committee on Antarctic Research (SCAR), 1993–2016.

References
 Bulgarian Antarctic Gazetteer. Antarctic Place-names Commission. (details in Bulgarian, basic data in English)
 SCAR Composite Antarctic Gazetteer

External links
 Lipen Glacier. Copernix satellite image

Glaciers of the Palmer Archipelago
Bulgaria and the Antarctic
Geography of Anvers Island